Vorhor, the Green Wave is one of the most famous paintings by French artist Georges Lacombe. It is currently located in the Indianapolis Museum of Art, which is in Indianapolis, Indiana. Painted 1896-97, Lacombe used egg tempera and the inspiration of Japanese prints to depict the cliffs of Vorhor in Brittany.

Description
North of Pont-Aven, Lacombe found this dramatic crag overlooking the sea and rendered it even more spectacular with vivid hues of turquoise, mauve, and gold. He also anthropomorphized the rocks, finding human shapes in them, and transformed the waves into decorative patterns similar to Japanese prints.
The back of the canvas bears an atelier monogram.

Historical information
In 1892, Lacombe first encountered Post-Impressionism, and was immediately smitten. He fully embraced Gauguin's insistence that artists be allowed to reinterpret nature when creating a series of coastal paintings between 1893 and 1897. The influence of Symbolism on Lacombe can be seen in the foreboding with which he imbued the narrow gap and pounding waves.

Acquisition
Sylvie Mora-Lacombe inherited the painting upon her father's death. It was purchased by the IMA in 1984 with the assistance of the  Alliance of the Indianapolis Museum of Art, where it was given the acquisition number 1984.202.

See also 
 Saintes-Maries (Van Gogh series)

References

External links
IMA page. 

1897 paintings
Post-impressionist paintings
Paintings in the collection of the Indianapolis Museum of Art
French paintings
Water in art